Jesper is a given name commonly believed to be of ancient Persian origin, meaning "Treasurer".

Some notable people with the name Jesper include:

Music
 Jesper Koch (born 1967), Danish composer
 Jesper Kyd (born 1972), Danish video game and film score composer
 Jesper Nordin (Danish conductor) (born 1975)
 Jesper Nordin (Swedish composer) (born 1971)
 Jesper Strömblad (born 1972), Swedish musician

Sports
 Jesper Appel (born 1993), Swedish ice hockey player
 Jesper Blomqvist (born 1974), Swedish footballer
 Jesper Christiansen (born 1978), Danish footballer
 Jesper Drost (born 1993), Dutch footballer
 Jesper Garnell (born 1958), Danish boxer
 Jesper Grønkjær (born 1977), Danish footballer
 Jesper Hansen (disambiguation)
 Jesper Horsted (born 1997), American football player
 Jesper Jansson (born 1971), Swedish footballer
 Jesper Knudsen (badminton) (born 1960), Danish player
 Jesper Mørkøv (born 1988), Danish racing cyclist
 Jesper Nelin (born 1992), Swedish biathlete
 Jesper Olsen (born 1961), Danish footballer
 Jesper Parnevik (born 1965), Swedish golfer
 Jesper Pedersen (disambiguation)
 Jesper Skibby (born 1964), Danish racing cyclist

Other
 Jesper Brochmand (1585–1652), Danish bishop of Zealand, Lutheran apologist
 Jesper Christensen (born 1948), Danish actor
 Jesper Mattson Cruus af Edeby (1576–1622), Swedish soldier and politician
 Jesper Harding (1799–1865), American publisher
 Jesper Højer (born 1978), Danish businessman
 Jesper Swedberg (1653–1735), Swedish bishop, father of Emanuel Swedenborg

Fictional characters
 Jesper Fahey from the Six of Crows novels
 Jesper Berg from Okkupert 2010s Norwegian television series
 Jesper from the Brotherband series
 Jesper from the Klaus movie

See also
 Jezper Söderlund, also known as Airbase, a Swedish musician specialising in electronic music
 Jasper (given name)
 All Wikipedia article titles beginning with Jesper

References

Masculine given names
Danish masculine given names
Swedish masculine given names
Scandinavian masculine given names